Pinjra may refer to:

 Pinjra (film), 1972 Marathi film, directed by V. Shantaram
 Pinjra (TV series), 2017 Pakistani television series aires on A-Plus TV
 Pinjra (2022 TV series), 2022 Pakistani television series aired on ARY Digital